The Bell's Gap Railroad was a  long standard gauge railroad in Pennsylvania. It was inaugurated in 1873 and consolidated in 1874.

History 
The Bell's Gap Railroad Company was incorporated under the general law of Pennsylvania on 11 May 1871, to construct a railway from Bell’s Mills, on the Pennsylvania Railroad, to Lloyds in Cambria County.

The Pennsylvania & North Western Railroad Company became the successor by change of name of the Bell's Gap Railroad Company on 9 May 1874.

Route and track 

The sharpest curvature was 28° with a  radius.

The weight of rail was 35 pounds to the yard (17.5 kg/m).

Rolling stock 

The weight of the engines was 15 tons. The following rolling stock was used in 1875: 
 2 locomotives
 2 passenger cars
 78 freight cars

Operation 
Operations for year ending 31 December 1875 were as follows:
 Gross earnings: $38,146.42
 Operating expenses: $18,504.85 (48.49 %)
 Net earnings, $19,641.57

External links 
 Narrow gauge railway
 Bellwood-Antis Historic Railroad Postcard Scans

References 

Standard gauge railways in the United States
Railway companies established in 1871

Defunct companies based in Pennsylvania
Defunct Pennsylvania railroads
1871 establishments in Pennsylvania